In enzymology, an acetate CoA-transferase is an enzyme that catalyzes the chemical reaction

acyl-CoA + acetate  a fatty acid anion + acetyl-CoA

Thus, the two substrates of this enzyme are acyl-CoA and acetate, whereas its two products are long-chain carboxylate anion and acetyl-CoA.

This enzyme belongs to the family of transferases, specifically the CoA-transferases. The systematic name of this enzyme class is acyl-CoA:acetate CoA-transferase. Other names in common use include acetate coenzyme A-transferase, butyryl CoA:acetate CoA transferase, butyryl coenzyme A transferase, and succinyl-CoA:acetate CoA transferase.

This enzyme participates in 4 metabolic pathways:
benzoate metabolism via ligation of CoA
propanoate metabolism
butanoate metabolism
two-component system.

Structural studies

As of late 2007, only one structure has been solved for this class of enzymes, with the PDB accession code .

References

External links

EC 2.8.3
Enzymes of known structure